Hamza Mohammed may refer to:

 Hamza Mohammed, Ghanaian footballer
 Hamza Mohamed, Maldivian footballer
 Hamza Mohamed Buri, Somali-Canadian politician